Crematogaster aculeata is a species of ant in tribe Crematogastrini. It was described by Donisthorpe in 1941.

References

aculeata
Insects described in 1941